First Draft News is a project "to fight mis- and disinformation online" founded in 2015 by nine organizations brought together by the Google News Lab. It includes Facebook, Twitter, the Open Society Foundations and several philanthropic organizations.

Project description 
The project draws on experts and organisations working in the field, including reported.ly, Eyewitness Media Hub, Storyful and Meedan. Google News Lab developed and maintains firstdraftnews.org and supports the creation of new content.

In September 2016, First Draft began coordinating "efforts between newsrooms, fact-checking organizations, and academic institutions to combat mis- and disinformation". Coalition members publish how-to guides addressing topcis such as ethics surrounding "use of eyewitness media" and how to "spot fake footage and hoaxes".

Newsrooms participating in the First Draft's CrossCheck project "cross-checked" each other, debunked stories, and developed methods to hinder "the spread of misleading and fabricated content" for the 2017 French, UK, and German elections. Claire Wardle, First Draft’s executive director, has stated: “With elections being a prime target for agents who create and spread disinformation, partnering with a research center that focuses on the intersection of media, politics and technology is a natural fit”.

In October 2017, First Draft moved to the Shorenstein Center on Media, Politics and Public Policy, part of the John F. Kennedy School of Government at Harvard University.

In February 2019, it was reported that First Draft has left Harvard, due to a "series of miscommunications".

Notes

See also
 Disinformation
 Fake News
 Misinformation

References

External links
 First Draft
 Information Futures Lab
 Google News Lab

American journalism organizations